Craig Mawson (born 16 May 1979 in Keighley, West Yorkshire) is an English former professional footballer who works as a goalkeeping coach for Manchester United.

Career

Burnley
Mawson started his career at Burnley, where he is now goalkeeper coach to the Under 18's side at the club, in a Full-time position. In December 2015, he was awarded the FA Goalkeeping Coach of the Year 2015 award.

Lincoln City
In September 2000, Lincoln City's manager Phil Stant signed Mawson on-loan as cover for his first-choice keeper Alan Marriott. Whilst the loan was extended to a second month, Mawson would remain an unused substitute in each of Lincoln's nine league games during this period before returning to Burnley.

Other clubs
Mawson has also played for Morecambe and Oldham Athletic. Whilst at Christie Park he was voted Player of the Year by the supporters for the 2002-03 season, when he notably saved two penalties in the semi-final of the Conference playoffs. However the team failed to progress to the final.

Following the liquidation of Halifax Town, Mawson signed a deal with Conference North team Droylsden.

Hyde
On 2 July 2010, he signed for Droylsden's rivals Hyde. He was due to make his Hyde debut on 17 July 2010 against Manchester City Reserves, but unexpectedly flew out to Singapore and had to be replaced by Brynn Hindley.

Return to Burnley
On 1 September 2010 Mawson signed for Burnley as a coach for the youth team.

Mawson was included in the reserve team on 27 October 2010 against Macclesfield and was a regular starter for the reserve team.

References

External links
 
Unofficial Craig Mawson Profile at The Forgotten Imp

1979 births
Living people
Burnley F.C. players
Lincoln City F.C. players
Halifax Town A.F.C. players
Oldham Athletic A.F.C. players
Hereford United F.C. players
Morecambe F.C. players
English footballers
Association football goalkeepers
Sportspeople from Keighley
English Football League players
National League (English football) players
Hyde United F.C. players
Burnley F.C. non-playing staff
Droylsden F.C. players